Alexandru Cornel Ioniță; born 14 December 1994) is a Romanian professional footballer who plays as an attacking midfielder or a winger for Liga I club Rapid București.

A product of Rapid București, he made his professional debut for them at age 16. Ioniță moved to Astra Giurgiu in 2014, winning four domestic trophies before being subject to a €1 million transfer to CFR Cluj four years later. After failing to impose himself and having loan stints at Universitatea Craiova and Astra, he returned to Rapid București in 2021.

Internationally, Ioniță earned his first cap for the Romania senior team in a 3–1 win over Kazakhstan in September 2017.

Club career

Rapid București
Born in Bucharest, Ioniță joined the academy of Rapid București at the age of six. On 21 May 2011, aged only 16 years and five months, he made his senior debut in a 1–0 Liga I win over FC Brașov.

In the 2013–14 edition of the second division, Ioniță totalled six goals from 14 appearances.

Astra Giurgiu
Ioniță moved to Astra Giurgiu during the winter transfer window of 2014, with fellow Liga I sides Dinamo București and Petrolul Ploiești also interested in signing him. He scored his first goal for Astra on 15 October 2015, in a 3–0 away victory over Viitorul Constanța for the Cupa Ligii.

On 2 May 2016, Ioniță netted twice in a 4–2 home success against Dinamo București as Astra celebrated its first league title. Following the transfer of Constantin Budescu to FCSB in June 2017, Ioniță took over his number 10 shirt. On 13 July that year, he recorded his first UEFA Europa League goal in a 3–1 home defeat of Zira for the second qualifying round.

Ioniță was named the Liga I Player of the Month for November 2017 after scoring in three consecutive league matches, against Universitatea Craiova, Concordia Chiajna and FCSB, respectively. Amid rumours of a transfer to CFR Cluj in early January 2018, Ioniță refused to renew his contract with Astra and was expelled from the first team for an undetermined period.

CFR Cluj
On 20 January 2018, Ioniță joined CFR Cluj's training camp in Spain after he was acquired for a rumoured fee of €1 million. Three days later, the move was made official. Ioniță made his competitive debut on 5 February, in a 2–0 league win against Concordia Chiajna at home. Later that month, he recorded his first goal for CFR in a 2–0 away success over Juventus București, after netting in the rebound from his penalty that had been saved by his former Rapid teammate Virgil Drăghia.

In July 2019, following a disappointing 2018–19 campaign in which he only scored two goals from 27 appearances in all competitions, Ioniță agreed to a one-year loan at Universitatea Craiova with a purchase option. After also failing to settle down at Craiova, the deal was terminated prematurely and he returned to Astra Giurgiu on loan at the start of 2020.

In September 2020, the Romanian Anti-Doping Agency handed Ioniță along with two of his Astra teammates a one-year playing ban after they each received intravenous injections of more than 100mL of vitamins within 24 hours. On 7 September 2021, CFR Cluj announced the termination of Ioniță's contract on a mutual agreement.

Return to Rapid București
 
On 16 September 2021, Ioniță re-signed for Rapid București as a free agent, after agreeing to a three-year contract. He played his first match on 17 October, a 2–0 victory over previous club CFR Cluj in the Liga I.

Ioniță scored his first goal upon return on 11 February 2022, equalising late in a 1–1 league draw with Sepsi OSK as his team played 40 minutes with one player less. On 13 March, he opened the scoring in a 3–1 Bucharest derby win against Dinamo, the first in almost 14 years.

International career
In September 2017, Ioniță was selected by the Romania senior team for the 2018 FIFA World Cup qualifiers against Kazakhstan and Denmark. He earned his first cap in the former match, coming on as an 80th-minute substitute for double goal scorer Constantin Budescu in the 3–1 win in Ploiești.

Personal life
Ioniță's father played football in the lower divisions and, like the son, is a supporter of Rapid București.

Career statistics

Club

International

Honours
Astra Giurgiu
Liga I: 2015–16
Cupa României: 2013–14
Supercupa României: 2014, 2016

CFR Cluj
Liga I: 2017–18, 2018–19
Supercupa României: 2018

Individual
Digi Sport Liga I Player of the Month: November 2017

References

External links

1994 births
Living people
Footballers from Bucharest
Romanian footballers
Association football midfielders
Association football wingers
Liga I players
Liga II players
FC Rapid București players
FC Astra Giurgiu players
CFR Cluj players
CS Universitatea Craiova players
Romania youth international footballers
Romania under-21 international footballers
Romania international footballers